Djinn is a 2023 Indian Malayalam-language fantasy drama film directed by Sidharth Bharathan and produced by Sudheer VK and Manu Valiyaveettil under the banner Straightline Cinemas . The film stars Soubin Shahir in the title role, along with Sharaf U Dheen, Shine Tom Chacko and Santhy Balachandran.

The screenplay and dialogue are written by Rajesh Gopinadhan,[1] who had penned Dulquer Salmaan's Kali. The music is composed by Prashant Pillai, while Girish Gangadharan has been roped in as the cinematographer and Deepu Joseph has done the editing.

Cast
Soubin Shahir as Lalappan
Sharaf U Dheen as Sukesh/Django
Shine Tom Chacko as Sudheep
Santhy Balachandran as Safa
Leona Lishoy as Thara Koshi
Sabumon Abdusamad as Paul Kattukaran
Jaffar Idukki as Aniyan Nair
Nishanth Sagar as Anwar Ibrahim
Sudheesh as Doctor 
K. P. A. C. Lalitha as Sulekha 
Smitha Ambu  as kaali
Bhanumathi Payyanur as Malli

Production 
The shooting of the film was completed in mid-March 2020.

Music
The music for the film is composed by Prashant Pillai with lyrics for the songs written by Santhosh Verma and Anwar Ali.

References

External links
 

2022 films
Films directed by Sidharth Bharathan
2022 drama films
Indian fantasy drama films
2020s Malayalam-language films
Films about mental health
Genies in film